National Route 385 is a national highway of Japan connecting Yanagawa, Fukuoka and Hakata-ku, Fukuoka in Japan, with a total length of 68.1 km (42.32 mi).

References

National highways in Japan
Roads in Fukuoka Prefecture
Roads in Saga Prefecture